Kenneth Posner is an American lighting designer, working on Broadway, Off-Broadway, and in American regional theatre.  His most notable designs include the musicals Wicked and Hairspray, two highly regarded musicals of the early 21st century. In 2007, he won the Tony Award for Best Lighting Design in a Play for his work on The Coast of Utopia (Part 2 - Shipwreck).

Career and education 
He has been nominated for the Tony Award for Best Lighting Design 11 times and won once for The Coast of Utopia (Part 2 - Shipwreck) in 2011. His nominations have included nods for Merchant of Venice (2011), Dirty Rotten Scoundrels (2005), Wicked (2004), Hairspray (2003), and The Adventures of Tom Sawyer (2001). He has also been nominated 10 times for the Drama Desk Award for Outstanding Lighting Design and received an Obie Award for Sustained Excellence in Lighting in 2003. In 2013, Posner achieved a near-sweep of the nominations for the Tony Award for Best Lighting Design of a Musical, garnering nods in three of the four eligible slots (for Kinky Boots, Pippin, and Rodgers + Hammerstein's Cinderella), though he lost to Matilda The Musical.

Posner was educated at SUNY Purchase, where Brian MacDevitt also attended.  He is a 1983 graduate of Eastchester High School in Eastchester, New York.  He also attended Boston University College of Fine Arts.

Personal life 
He is currently a resident of Verona, New Jersey and was born in 1966.

Productions

Broadway 

 The Rose Tattoo – 1995
 The Father – 1996
 Getting Away With Murder – 1996
 The Rehearsal – 1996
 The Last Night of Ballyhoo – 1997
 The Little Foxes – 1997
 A View From the Bridge – 1997
 Side Man – 1998
 Little Me – 1998
 You're a Good Man, Charlie Brown – 1999
 The Lion in Winter – 1999
 Swing! – 1999
 Uncle Vanya – 2000
 The Adventures of Tom Sawyer – 2001
 The Goat, or Who Is Sylvia? – 2002
 The Smell of the Kill – 2002
 The Man Who Had All the Luck – 2002
 Hairspray – 2002
 Imaginary Friends – 2002
 Wicked – 2003
 Oldest Living Confederate Widow Tells All – 2003 
 The Frogs – 2004
 Little Women – 2005
 Dirty Rotten Scoundrels – 2005
 Glengarry Glen Ross – 2005
 The Odd Couple – 2005
 Lestat – 2005
 The Coast of Utopia (Part 2 - Shipwreck) – 2006
 The Pirate Queen – 2007
 Legally Blonde – 2007
 Grease – 2007
 The Homecoming – 2007
 9 to 5 – 2009
 The Royal Family – 2009
 The Miracle Worker – 2010
 Lend Me a Tenor – 2010
 Mrs. Warren's Profession – 2010
 A Life in the Theatre – 2010
 The Merchant of Venice – 2010
 Elling – 2010
 Catch Me if You Can – 2010
 Relatively Speaking – 2011
 Other Desert Cities – 2011
 Gore Vidal's The Best Man – 2012
 The Columnist – 2012
 Harvey – 2012
 Rogers + Hammerstein's Cinderella – 2013
 Kinky Boots – 2013
 Pippin – 2013
 If/Then – 2014
 Disgraced – 2014
 Finding Neverland – 2015
 On Your Feet! – 2015
 Tuck Everlasting – 2016
 War Paint – 2017
 John Lithgow: Stories by Heart – 2018
 Mean Girls – 2018
 Pretty Woman: The Musical – 2018
 Beetlejuice – 2019
Take Me Out – 2021

Touring 

 Swing! (2000-2001)
 Hairspray (2003-2006)
 Wicked Tours
 Emerald City Tour (2005-2015)
 Chicago Tour (2005-2009)
 Los Angeles Tour (2007-2009)
 San Francisco Tour (2009-2010)
 Munchkinland Tour (2009-present)
 Little Women (2005-2006)
 Dirty Rotten Scoundrels (2006-2007)
 Grease (2008-2010)
 Kinky Boots (2014-2017)
 Pippin (2014-2016)
 Rogers + Hammerstein's Cinderella (2014-2016)
 If/Then (2015-2016)
 Finding Neverland (2016-2018)
 On Your Feet! (2017-2019)
 Mean Girls (2019-present)
 Pretty Woman: The Musical (upcoming)

West End 

 Hairspray – 2007
 Legally Blonde – 2010
 Kinky Boots – 2015
 On Your Feet! – 2019
 Wicked – 2021
 Pretty Woman: The Musical – 2021

Off-Broadway 

Emerald City – 1988
Come As You Are – 1990
Machinal – 1990
Walking the Dead – 1991
Ruthless! – 1992
Spike Heels – 1992
Flaubert's Latest – 1992
The Madame MacAdam Traveling Theatre – 1992
On the Bum – 1992
On the Open Road – 1993
Sophistry – 1993
Time on Fire – 1993
Marisol (play) – 1993
Johnny Pye and the Fool-Killer – 1993
The Swan – 1994
Suburbia – 1994
A Cheever Evening – 1994
The Scarlett Letter – 1994
The Rose Tattoo – 1995
The Radical Mystique – 1995
Endgame – 1995
Wake Up, I'm Fat– 1995
"Cowgirls – 1996The Blues Are Running – 1996Nine Armenians – 1996Dealer's Choice – 1997Collected Stories  – 1997As Bees In Honey Drown  – 1997Misalliance  – 1997Pride's Crossing  – 1997Side Man  – 1998Labor Day  – 19982.5 Minute Ride  – 1999That Championship Season  – 1999The Author's Voice & Imagining Brad  – 1999Give Me Your Answer, Do!  – 1999The Play About the Baby – 2000The Wild Party – 2000The Altruists – 2000The Waverly Gallery – 2000The Winter's Tale – 2000The Credeaux Canvas – 2001Tick, Tick... Boom! – 2001Music from a Sparkling Planet – 2001Hobson's Choice – 2002Monster – 2002F-ing A – 2003A Little Night Music – 2003Valhalla – 2004Can-Can – 2004
 Entertaining Mr. Sloane – 2006Satellites – 2006Parlour Song – 2008The New Century – 2008Good Boys and True – 2008The Savannah Disputation – 2008The Toxic Avenger – 2009Our House – 2009The Understudy – 2009Mr. and Mrs. Fitch – 2010Me, Myself & I – 2010Other Desert Cities – 2011Death Takes a Holiday – 2011If I Forget – 2017A Parallelogram – 2017Amy and the Orphans – 2018Long Lost – 2019The Perplexed'' – 2020

Awards and nominations

Tony Awards

Drama Desk Awards

Obie Award

References

External links

Year of birth missing (living people)
Living people
Tony Award winners
Obie Award recipients
Boston University College of Fine Arts alumni
Eastchester High School alumni
People from Verona, New Jersey